The Thai Forest Conservation Party (FCP) is a green political party in Thailand, first registered as the Thai Forest Land Reclamation Party (FRP) in 2012 by Damrong Pidej, former director-general of the Department of National Parks, Wildlife and Plant Conservation. It was officially approved by the Election Commission in 2013. The name of the party was later changed to its current form in 2018.

The party took part in the 2014 general elections, but the election was declared void.

In the 2019 general elections, the party won two party-list seats and joined a coalition headed by the Phalang Pracharath Party with enough seats to form a government. However, following reports that the governmental posts related to the environment would be given to another party, the FCP has threatened to pull out of the coalition. The party has stated that in such a case it will not join the "pro-democracy" opposition parties led by Pheu Thai, but would form its own independent opposition.

Election Results

References

External links 

 Official party facebook

Political parties in Thailand
Political parties established in 2012
2012 establishments in Thailand
Green parties in Asia